Clay Campbell (May 21, 1901 - June 1, 1989) was an American film makeup artist. He was Head of Makeup for 20th Century Fox. He later worked at Columbia Pictures. He is known as perhaps the only collector of lip imprints of famous female movie stars, amassing over 1,000 of them before his death in 1989. His collection includes lip imprints by actresses such as Marlene Dietrich, Donna Reed and Rita Hayworth.

Select filmography

Gilda
In a Lonely Place
Born Yesterday (1950 film)
Death of a Salesman (1951 film)
The Big Heat
From Here to Eternity

References

External links

Clay Campbell papers at the Margaret Herrick Library, Academy of Motion Picture Arts and Sciences

1901 births
1989 deaths
American make-up artists